Lindholmen may refer to:

Places
 Lindholmen, Gothenburg, a district on the island of Hisingen
 Lindholmen, Karlskrona, an island south of Karlskrona
 Lindholmen, Vallentuna, a locality in Stockholm County

Other uses
 Lindholmen Castle, a former Danish castle in Scania
 Lindholmen Castle, Västergötland, a ruined castle in Lidköping Municipality
 Lindholmens or Lindholmen varv, a Swedish shipyard in Gothenburg
 Lindholmen Castle (Gothenburg), a medieval castle in Gothenburg

See also
 Lindholm (disambiguation)
 Lindholme (disambiguation)